Archibald Edwin Wise (July 31, 1912 – February 2, 1978) was a professional baseball player. A right-handed pitcher, he appeared in two games in Major League Baseball for the Chicago White Sox in 1932. For his career, he recorded no decisions, with a 4.91 earned run average, and two strikeouts in 7.1 innings pitched.

Wise was born in Waxahachie, Texas, and died in Dallas, Texas at the age of 65.

External links

Major League Baseball pitchers
Chicago White Sox players
Waterloo Hawks (baseball) players
Gadsden Pilots players
Baseball players from Texas
1912 births
1978 deaths